Jack Leaman (December 22, 1932 – March 6, 2004) was an American college basketball coach, best known as the head coach of the UMass Minutemen basketball team from 1966 to 1979.

Career
He would become the school's all-time winningest coach, compiling an overall record of 217–126. His teams won 8 Yankee Conference titles and earned 6 trips to the National Invitational Tournament. A 2-time New England Coach of the Year, he was inducted into the Boston University Athletic Hall of Fame in 1977, the UMass Athletic Hall of Fame in 1988, and the New England Basketball Hall of Fame in 2003. Some of the players he coached during his tenure include Julius Erving, Rick Pitino, and Al Skinner. In all, he coached 22 All-Yankee Conference selections during his coaching career.  Leaman also served as a radio color commentator for UMass men's basketball for 10 seasons beginning in 1994, and served as head coach for the UMass Minutewomen basketball team for the 1986–87 season. The basketball court at the Mullins Center is named in his honor.

Born in Boston in 1932, Leaman graduated from Cambridge Rindge and Latin School in 1951. After 2 years in the United States Army, and after receiving an honorable discharge, Leaman earned both a bachelor's and master's degree from Boston University. He led the BU basketball team in both scoring and assists during his 3-year playing career. As senior captain in 1959, he led the Terriers to an overall record of 20–7, culminating with a trip to the NCAA East Regional Final. His number 10 was retired by Boston University in 2008.

Leaman was appointed UMass assistant basketball coach in 1961 under head coach Matthew Zunic, who had coached him as a player at BU. Leaman continued as an assistant under Johnny Orr until he was promoted to head coach for the 1966-67 season.

Head coaching record

Men's basketball

Women's basketball

References 

1932 births
2004 deaths
American men's basketball coaches
American men's basketball players
American women's basketball coaches
Basketball coaches from Massachusetts
Basketball players from Boston
Boston University Terriers men's basketball players
College men's basketball head coaches in the United States
Sportspeople from Boston
UMass Minutemen basketball coaches
UMass Minutewomen basketball coaches
Guards (basketball)